Group F of the 2019 FIFA Women's World Cup took place from 11 to 20 June 2019. The group consisted of Chile, Sweden, Thailand and the United States. The top two teams, the United States and Sweden, advanced to the round of 16.

Teams

Notes

Standings

In the round of 16:
 The winners of Group F, the United States, advanced to play the runners-up of Group B, Spain.
 The runners-up of Group F, Sweden, advanced to play the runners-up of Group E, Canada.

Matches
All times listed are local, CEST (UTC+2).

Chile vs Sweden
At 19:30 CEST, in the 72nd minute, the match was interrupted due to severe weather. The match resumed at 20:12 CEST.

United States vs Thailand

The United States opened their defence of their Women's World Cup title with a 13–0 victory against Thailand, setting a new record for the largest margin of victory in the tournament's history, as well as the most goals in a match. Alex Morgan scored five times, tying a tournament and team record set by Michelle Akers for most goals scored by a player in a single World Cup match, while four of her teammates scored their first World Cup goals in their debut at the tournament. The U.S. team were later criticised for celebrating their later goals during the match, with some media commentators and former players calling it disrespectful, but the celebrations were defended by other media commentators, the team's players and members of the opposing Thai bench.

Sweden vs Thailand

United States vs Chile
The United States fielded a reserve squad with seven changes to the starting lineup to rest its players ahead of the final group stage match against Sweden. Carli Lloyd scored in the 11th minute from the edge of the penalty area and Julie Ertz added a second with a header on a corner kick in the 26th minute. Lloyd scored her second goal of the match in the 35th minute, heading in another corner kick, and missed a penalty kick in the 81st minute that would have given her a hat-trick. Chilean goalkeeper Christiane Endler made several major saves as her team was outshot 26–1, and was named the player of the match for her efforts. With her brace, Carli Lloyd set a new record for most consecutive World Cup appearances with a goal, having scored six matches in a row (starting in the 2015 knockout stage), surpassing the record of German forward Birgit Prinz from 2003.

Sweden vs United States

Thailand vs Chile

Discipline
Fair play points would have been used as tiebreakers in the group if the overall and head-to-head records of teams were tied, or if teams had the same record in the ranking of third-placed teams. These were calculated based on yellow and red cards received in all group matches as follows:
first yellow card: minus 1 point;
indirect red card (second yellow card): minus 3 points;
direct red card: minus 4 points;
yellow card and direct red card: minus 5 points;

Only one of the above deductions were applied to a player in a single match.

References

External links
 
 2019 FIFA Women's World Cup Group F, FIFA.com

2019 FIFA Women's World Cup
United States at the 2019 FIFA Women's World Cup
Thailand at the 2019 FIFA Women's World Cup
Chile at the 2019 FIFA Women's World Cup
Sweden at the 2019 FIFA Women's World Cup